Kruge is a village in Croatia. It is connected by the D218 highway.

Population

According to the 2011 census, Kruge had 54 inhabitants.

Note: From 1857-1880 include part of data for the settlements of Gornji Štrbci and Mišljenovac. From 1857-1880 part of data is include in the settlement of Nebljusi.

1991 census

According to the 1991 census, settlement of Kruge had 126 inhabitants, which were ethnically declared as this:

Austro-hungarian 1910 census

According to the 1910 census, settlement of Kruge had 737 inhabitants in 3 hamlets, which were linguistically and religiously declared as this:

Literature 

  Savezni zavod za statistiku i evidenciju FNRJ i SFRJ, popis stanovništva 1948, 1953, 1961, 1971, 1981. i 1991. godine.
 Knjiga: "Narodnosni i vjerski sastav stanovništva Hrvatske, 1880-1991: po naseljima, autor: Jakov Gelo, izdavač: Državni zavod za statistiku Republike Hrvatske, 1998., ;

References

Populated places in Lika-Senj County